Latimer Lake is a lake in Todd County, in the U.S. state of Minnesota.

Latimer Lake was named for Alfred Eugene Latimer, a U.S. Army officer who was stationed in the area.

See also
List of lakes in Minnesota

References

Lakes of Minnesota
Lakes of Todd County, Minnesota